The Last Five Minutes (Italian: Gli ultimi cinque minuti) is a 1955 French-Italian comedy film directed by Giuseppe Amato and starring Linda Darnell, Vittorio De Sica and Peppino De Filippo. It is also known by the alternative title of It Happens in Roma.

The film's art direction was by Guido Fiorini.

Plot
In the post-World War II Vittorio De Sica as Carlo Reani is looking for an apartment and finds the perfect one, but Linda Darnell as Renata Adorni is being shown the apartment at the same time. They both decide to obtain it but bump into each other with their realtors and a dispute begins as to who has a right to the apartment as Renata says it is hers as she has sent in a contract. They send their realtors racing to get it and bring their luggage back first, but they return at the same time. However Carlo proposes marriage to Renata and she accepts and they end up getting it together.

Cast

References

Bibliography
 Davis, Ronald L. Hollywood Beauty: Linda Darnell and the American Dream. University of Oklahoma Press, 2014.

External links
 

1955 films
1950s Italian-language films
French comedy-drama films
Italian comedy-drama films
Films directed by Giuseppe Amato
1955 comedy-drama films
Minerva Film films
Films scored by Alessandro Cicognini
French black-and-white films
Italian black-and-white films
1950s French films
1950s Italian films